Hyalessa is a genus of cicadas in the subfamily Cicadinae, found in the Palearctic and East Asia. It is the sole genus in the tribe Sonatini.

Species
These species belong to the genus Hyalessa:

References

External links

Sonatini
Cicadidae genera